Ulrike "Uli" Herzner (born 23 April 1971) is a fashion designer originally from East Germany, currently living in Miami Beach, Florida. She was a contestant on the third season of the Bravo network reality television series Project Runway, where she finished runner-up to Jeffrey Sebelia. She starred in her own show, It's Very Uli on Plum TV, and finished as second runner-up on season 2 of Project Runway All-Stars.

Herzner is a freelance stylist, and sells dresses at boutiques in Palm Beach and on her website.

References

German fashion designers
German women fashion designers
German expatriates in the United States
Artists from Miami
1971 births
Living people
Project Runway (American series) participants